A backroad is a secondary type of road.

Backroads may refer to:

 Backroads, a 2010 EP by English band Lonely the Brave
 Backroads (1977 film), a 1977 Australian film directed by Phillip Noyce
 Backroads (album), a 1992 album by Ricky Van Shelton
Backroads (song), the title track of the above album
 Backroads (1997 film), a 1997 Spanish film directed by Emilio Martínez-Lázaro
 Back Roads (2018 film), an American drama film directed by Alex Pettyfer

See also
Back Roads (disambiguation)